Sir Terence John Stephenson,  (born December 1957) is a Northern Irish consultant paediatric doctor and chair of the Health Research Authority (HRA). He is also the Nuffield Professor of Child Health at University College London (UCL). Stephenson was most notable for guiding the RCPCH in agreeing 10 published national standards, Facing the Future: Standards for Paediatric Services. This was the first time the College committed publicly to a defined set of standards for all children receiving inpatient care or assessment across the UK.

Early life
He was born in Larne, County Antrim, Northern Ireland. He was educated at Larne Grammar School. He attended the University of Bristol, Imperial College London, University of Oxford and University of Nottingham.

Career
He was formerly Dean of the Medical School and Professor of Child Health at the University of Nottingham from 2003−2009. In 2009 he became the Nuffield Professor of Child Health at UCL Great Ormond Street Institute of Child Health. He was President of the Royal College of Paediatrics and Child Health from April 2009 until May 2012. He then took up the role of chair of the Academy of Medical Royal Colleges in July 2012.

He became a member of the GMC council in 2009. In September 2014 it was announced that he would become the chair of the GMC, succeeding Peter Rubin on 1 January 2015.

In October 2014 it was announced that he had been appointed as a panel member for the Independent Panel Inquiry into Child Sexual Abuse.

In September 2019 he was appointed Chair of the Health Research Authority, succeeding Professor Sir Jonathan Montgomery.

In April 2020 he was appointed as a Vice-President of The Academy of Experts.

He has co-authored textbooks, written invited chapters and editorials, and published more than 150 peer-reviewed papers in academic journals. He has been described as leading by example.

Throughout 2021 and 2022 Stephenson researched the effects of COVID-19 on British teenagers in a UK-based study named CLoCk (Children & young people with Long Covid).

Awards and honours
By March 2016, ten honorary Fellowships had been bestowed on Stephenson from colleges based in the UK, Ireland, Hong Kong and Australia. In November 2014 he received an honorary fellowship from the Royal College of General Practitioners. In May 2015 he was elected a fellow of the Faculty of Pain Medicine. Stephenson was appointed a Knight Bachelor in the 2018 New Year Honours for services to Healthcare and Children’s Health Services.

References

 

 
 
 
 
 
 

Living people
British paediatricians
21st-century British medical doctors
People educated at Larne Grammar School
Academics of University College London
Knights Bachelor
Recipients of the James Spence Medal
1957 births
Chairs of the General Medical Council
Fellows of the Royal College of Physicians
Honorary Fellows of the Royal College of General Practitioners
Honorary Fellows of the Academy of Medical Educators